is a 1957 black and white Japanese film drama directed by Tomotaka Tasaka.

Cast 
 Yujiro Ishihara
 Mie Kitahara
 Masahiko Tsugawa
 Nobuo Kaneko
 Akira Kobayashi

References

External links 

 an image

Japanese black-and-white films
1957 films
Films directed by Tomotaka Tasaka
Nikkatsu films
1950s Japanese films